D2, D02, D.II, D II or D-2 may refer to:

Places
 Dublin 2, a Dublin, Ireland postcode
 D2 motorway (Czech Republic)
 D2 road (Croatia), a state route in Croatia
 D2 motorway (Slovakia)
 Mount Dulang-dulang, the second highest mountain of the Philippines
 D2, a line of Moscow Central Diameters

Arts & entertainment
 D-2 (mixtape), a 2020 album by South Korean rapper Agust D
 D2: The Mighty Ducks, the second film in The Mighty Ducks trilogy
 R2-D2, a robotic Star Wars character
 "D²", a 2002 episode of Dexter's Laboratory
 D2 (video game), a 1999 game for the Sega Dreamcast
 D2, an abbreviation of the video game Diablo II or Destiny 2

Business
 D2 (hotel chain), owned by Dusit Thani Group
 D2 Mannesmann, the former name of Vodafone's German division, which resulted from the acquisition of the German company Mannesmann AG
 D2 (magazine), published by Dagens Næringsliv
 D2, the IATA code for Damania Airways

Biology or medicine 
 ATC code D02 Emollients and protectives, a subgroup of the Anatomical Therapeutic Chemical Classification System
 Dopamine receptor D2, a protein
 Levuglandin D2
 Prostaglandin D2 receptor, a G-protein coupled receptor
 Resolvin D2
 Cyclin D2 (CCND2)
 Vitamin D2, or ergocalciferol
 D02, the ICD-10 code for carcinoma in situ of middle ear and respiratory system
 DIO2, Type II iodothyronine deiodinase, an enzyme involved in the thyroid system

Vehicles

Aircraft
 Albatros D.II, a 1916 German fighter aircraft
 Aviatik (Berg) D.II, a 1917 -Hungarian fighter prototype
 STS-55 or D2, the second German-sponsored Spacelab mission
 Daimler D.II, a Daimler aircraft
 Delta D2, an Australian diesel-powered helicopter design
 Dunne D.2, a British Dunne aircraft
 Euler D.II, a 1917 German single-seat fighter
 Fokker D.II, a WWI German fighter biplane 
 Halberstadt D.II, a 1916 German biplane fighter aircraft
 Hughes D-2, a 1943 mysterious American fighter and bomber project
 LFG Roland D.II, a 1917 German single-seat fighter
 Phönix D.II, a variant of the Hungarian First World War biplane fighter  D.I
 Schütte-Lanz D.II, a 1915 variant of the German Schütte-Lanz D.I aircraft

Aircraft engines
 Alfa Romeo D2, a 1931 Italian nine-cylinder radial engine for aircraft use 
 Mercedes D.II, a WWI 6-cylinder, liquid-cooled inline aircraft engine

Locomotives
 Bavarian D II, an 1898 German goods train tank locomotive model
 Bavarian D II (Ostbahn), an 1866 German goods train tender locomotive model
 Bavarian D II (old), an 1873 small tank locomotive
 GS&WR Class D2, a Great Southern and Western Railway Irish steam locomotive
 LB&SCR D2 class, a British locomotive class
 GNR Class D2, a class of British steam locomotives 
 PRR D2, an 1868 American steam locomotive model

Ships
 HMS Attacker (D02), a 1941 American-built escort aircraft carrier
 HMS Devonshire (D02), a 1962 County-class destroyer
 HMS Inglefield (D02), a 1936 I-class destroyer and flotilla leader of the British Royal Navy
 , a 1909 American submarine

Other vehicles
 Char D2, a French tank

Electronics
 Cowon D2, a 2007 portable media player with touch screen interface 
 Datasaab D2, a Swedish concept computer completed in 1960
 d2, a brand of computer peripherals manufactured by the French firm électronique d2, now trading as LaCie
 D2 kit, a microprocessor development kit MEK6800D2
 D-2 (video), a professional digital video format
 DOCSIS 2, a cable modem standard

Other uses
 D2, the Codex Claromontanus, a 6th-century Greek-Latin uncial manuscript of the New Testament
 D2, a dihedral group in group theory
 D2, deuterium, an isotope of hydrogen
 D2, an almond-shaped cloud on Neptune
 D2, the code for permission to use specific land or premises for leisure (cinemas, swimming baths, gymnasiums) in town and country planning in the United Kingdom
 Division II (disambiguation), in sports leagues, etc.
 Marcelo D2 (born 1967), Brazilian rapper
 D2, an abbreviation for DOCSIS 2.0, an international telecommunications standard
 D2 steel, a type of D-Grade tool steel with good wear resistance commonly found in shears and high end knives
 D2, gaming notation for a 2-sided die, such as a coin
 D2, a standard paper size between B2 and A1
 D2 Subway, a planned Dallas, Texas light rail tunnel

See also
 2D (disambiguation)
 DII (disambiguation)